Beatrix or Beatrice of Bourbon may refer to:
 Beatrix of Burgundy, Dame de Bourbon (1257–1310)
 Beatrice of Bourbon (1320–1383)
 Infanta Beatriz of Spain (Beatriz de Borbón y Battenberg; 1909–2002)
 Princess Béatrice of Bourbon-Two Sicilies (born 1950)